Bobbili Puli is a 1982 Indian Telugu-language action film written and directed by Dasari Narayana Rao. The film stars N. T. Rama Rao and Sridevi, with music composed by J. V. Raghavulu. The film was a big hit, collecting 3.5 Crore in its theatrical run. It was remade in Hindi as Zakhmi Sher (1984).

Plot
Major Chakradhar is a soldier who leads a happy life with his mother Annapurna, sister Jayanti, and fiancée Vijaya, an advocate. He is about to get married to Vijaya, but just before their wedding, the Indian army declares an emergency. So, Chakradhar postpones the wedding and goes to the battlefield.  Acharya Shankaraiah is involved in treasonous activities under the garb of a Sage by keeping officials under his clutch. Annapurna visits Shankaraiah's Ashram and recognizes him as her estranged husband who was once in the Indian Army. Years ago, they separated after she discovered him betraying his country for monetary gains. A frightened Shankaraiah kills Annapurna as she may reveal his identity. Chakradhar stays on to fight even after receiving the news of his mother's death. He is honored with the Maha Veera Chakra for his bravery. When he returns home, he finds out that his sister is in love with a man named Murali. He goes to Murali's father, Kondala Rao, with a marriage proposal, but Rao stipulates that he will only agree to this marriage if Chakradhar marries his developmentally challenged daughter, Jyothi. Chakradhar agrees to do so and sacrifices his love for Vijaya in the process. Chakradhar begins to see how there are treacherous and unjust things happening everywhere. An industrialist, Rajanala commits arson by burning down an empty warehouse by hiding grains and a man named Bheema Raju kills several innocent people while drunk driving. Each time Chakradhar files a case against such people they are acquitted by the court after Shankaraiah bribes the officials and provides fake alibies for everyone. Chakradhar grows frustrated with the system and when he angrily berates the judicial system he is thrown in jail for contempt. Meanwhile, while on their honeymoon Jayanti is raped and her husband Murali is killed by Prasad (Prasad Babu) son of Shankaraiah’s acolyte Bhanoji Rao. Jayanti subsequently dies due to the assault. Having reached the end of his patience, Chakradhar revolts against the system and becomes the 'outlaw', "Bobbili Puli" who hunts down anti-social elements. Alarmed by this, the government appoints  a special officer, Gopinath, to capture Chakradhar. Gopinath reaches out to Chakradhar requesting him to surrender and assures him that justice will prevail. However, Chakradhar refuses to stop until his mission is completed. To lure out Chakradhar, Prasad murders Jyothi. This plan succeeds, but it backfires on Prasad as Chakradhar kills him and his father Bhanoji Rao. Finally, he confronts 
Shankaraiah and finds out that not only is Shankaraiah his father, but he is also the murderer of his mother Annapurna. Chakradhar kills Shankaraiah before surrendering to the police. During his trial, Chakradhar expresses his disgust with the existing system including how the government, judiciary, and law and order operates. He pleads with the people to work to actively reform the system. At the end of his trial, Chakradhar is judged to be guilty and is sentenced to death.

Cast

N. T. Rama Rao as Major Chakradhar
Sridevi as Vijaya 
Rao Gopal Rao as Bhanoji Rao 
Satyanarayana as Acharya Shankaraiah / Satyam 
Allu Ramalingaiah as Bobbili Pilli
Murali Mohan as Murali 
Prabhakar Reddy as Dr. Rao
Jaggayya as Inspector Gopinath
Prasad Babu as Prasad Babu 
Raja as Raja 
Bob Christo as Goon
Mikkilineni as I.G.
Mukkamala as Advocate Krishna Murthy 
Rajanala as Rajanala 
Dhulipala as  Judge 
Raavi Kondala Rao as Kondala Rao 
Tyagaraju as S.P.
Vankayala Satyanarayana as Army Officer 
Telephone Satyanarayana as Army Officer 
Chalapathi Rao as Inspector 
Ch. Krishna Murthy as Inspector Krishna Murthy 
Bheema Raju as Bheema Raju 
Jagga Rao as Goon
Jayachitra as Jyothi 
Ambika as  Jayanthi
Subhashini as item number
Vijaya Lalitha as item number 
Jyothi Lakshmi as item number 
Jayamalini as item number 
Pushpalatha as Annapurnamma 
Jaya Vijaya as Nurse
Jayaseela
Shyamala

Soundtrack

Music composed by J. V. Raghavulu. All songs are evergreen blockbusters. Music released by SEA Records Audio Company.

Reception
The film had 2 direct 175-day runs, 15 direct 100-day centers and 39 100-days centers including shift, movie collected around 72 Lakhs gross collections in its first week and in full run around 3.5 crores gross. The film also reportedly served as a political tool for NTR, who had started his campaign to become chief minister, and has been attributed as a factor for his victory.

In a 2020 review, Roktim Rajpal of the Deccan Herald praised the film's music, acting and screenplay.

References

External links
 

1982 films
Films directed by Dasari Narayana Rao
Films scored by J. V. Raghavulu
Telugu films remade in other languages
1980s Telugu-language films
1982 action films
Indian action films
Indian Army in films